Spectrum Sports was a regional sports network owned by Charter Communications that served North and South Carolina. It was formerly known as Time Warner Cable SportsChannel and was rebranded after Charter's acquisition of Time Warner Cable in May 2016. The network had one feed serving Eastern North Carolina, Western North Carolina, and the Columbia/Myrtle Beach area of South Carolina. The network featured non-gameday programming from the Carolina Panthers, local high school sports, and college sports. The channel was led by General Manager Jason Lockhart.

In 2017, in an effort to reduce duplicity, Charter Communications closed down the Spectrum Sports outlets that shared markets with Spectrum News and merged them with their news counterparts. Spectrum Sports Carolinas' remaining programming was merged into Spectrum News North Carolina.

 
Television channels and stations disestablished in 2017
Defunct local cable stations in the United States
Defunct mass media in North Carolina
Defunct mass media in South Carolina